Cyclopentanone is the organic compound with the formula (CH2)4CO. This cyclic ketone is a colorless volatile liquid.

Preparation
Upon treatment  with barium hydroxide at elevated temperatures, adipic acid undergoes ketonization to give cyclopentanone:
(CH2)4(CO2H)2  →  (CH2)4CO  +  H2O  + CO2

Uses
Cyclopentanone is common precursor to fragrances, especially those related to jasmine and jasmone.  Examples include 2-pentyl- and 2-heptylcyclopentanone.  It is a versatile synthetic intermediate, being a precursor to cyclopentobarbital.

Cyclopentanone is also used to make cyclopentamine, the pesticide pencycuron, and pentethylcyclanone.

It is also used as a precursor to cubane-1,4-dicarboxylate, which is used to synthesize other substituted cubanes, such as the high explosives heptanitrocubane and octonitrocubane.

References

5
Ketone solvents
Perfume ingredients
Cyclopentanes